Constantia was launched at Swansea in 1816. She sailed as a coaster, and across the Atlantic, making at least two voyages bringing immigrants to Canada. In April 1832, she was the first of four ships that arrived at Quebec within a month with passengers having died of cholera. She and the vessels that followed her introduced the 1826–1837 cholera pandemic to North America as it spread from Quebec to the rest of Canada and down to the United States. She was last listed in 1848.

Career
Constantia first appeared in 'Lloyd's Register (LR) in 1816.

In 1819 Constantia, Moyne, master, brought 90 immigrants from Waterford to Quebec, arriving on 15 August.

In autumn 1831 the Government of Quebec established a quarantine station on Grosse-Île, Quebec in response to warnings about cholera from the Colonial Office in London. It also established a sanitary commission in February 1832, specifically to deal with cholera. A few months later it established a Board of Health.

On 28 April 1732 Constantia arrived from Limerick. She had embarked 170 migrants, 29 of whom had died on the voyage. Robert arrived on 14 May from Cork; she had had 10 deaths on board. On 28 May, Elizabeth arrived from Dublin; she had embarked 200 migrants and had 17 or 20 deaths on board. Lastly, Carrick arrived on 3 June from Dublin; she had embarked 145 migrants and had 42 deaths on board.

There was little knowledge of the disease or how it spread, and the quarantine at Grosse-Île was minimal. Soiled clothing and bedding was not washed, and there was no disinfection. Any passenger who did not exhibit symptoms was permitted to go leave. Between 2 and 5 June, no fewer than 750 passengers went on to Québec and Montréal. On 7 June, Voyageur, a steam boat, took a number of immigrants from Grosse Île to Québec and Montréal. Cholera appeared in Québec on 8 June, and in Montréal on 10 June, and many accounts credit Voyager with the dissemination. However, cases had been sent to those cities before that. The disease spread along Lake Ontario, and down Lake Champlain to Albany, and New York. Those places that did not permit passengers to land from steamboats escaped the disease.

Notes

Citations

References
 
 
 
 

1816 ships
Age of Sail merchant ships of England